The 1864 United States presidential election in Louisiana took place on November 8, 1864, as part of the 1864 United States presidential election. 

Louisiana voted for incumbent Republican President Abraham Lincoln. The state (along with Tennessee) chose electors for the election after being captured early in the American Civil War. However, due to issues related to the Civil War, their votes were rejected.

See also
 United States presidential elections in Louisiana

Footnotes

References

Louisiana
1864
1864 Louisiana elections